The 2010 FIBA Africa Under-18 Championship for Men (alternatively the Afrobasket U18) was the 17th FIBA Africa Under-18 Championship for Men, organized by FIBA Africa and played under the auspices of the Fédération Internationale de Basketball, the basketball sport governing body and the African zone thereof. The tournament was held from October 8–17 in Rwanda and won by Egypt.

The tournament qualified both the winner and the runner-up for the 2011 Under-19 World Cup.

Format
The 11 teams were divided into two groups (Groups A+B) for the preliminary round.
Round robin for the preliminary round; the top four teams advanced to the quarterfinals.
From there on a knockout system was used until the final.

Squads

Draw

Preliminary round

Group A

Group B

Knockout stage 
Championship bracket

5-8th bracket

9th place

Quarterfinals

Classification 5–8

Semifinals

Seventh place game

Fifth place game

Bronze medal game

Gold medal game

Final standings

Awards

Statistical Leaders

See also
 2009 FIBA Africa Under-16 Championship

External links
Official Website

References

2010 FIBA Africa Under-18 Championship
2010 FIBA Africa Under-18 Championship
2010 FIBA Africa Under-18 Championship
Basketball in Rwanda